Pečenice (previously ) is a village and municipality in the Levice District in the Nitra Region of Slovakia, on the edge of the Štiavnica Mountains. It is noted for its vineyards and viticulture.

Geography
It has a population of about 126 people.

History

The Late Romanesque parish church, dedicated to the Assumption of the Virgin Mary, dates from the mid-13th century. It once belonged to the Premonstratensian monastery at Šahy.

It has never been scientifically investigated and its age and origin are unknown. There are many theories about it, including that it marks the limit of the Roman Empire.

Ethnicity
The village is approximately 99% Slovak.

Facilities
The village has a public library and football pitch.

References

External links
Slovak Government statistical website
Slovak Historical Monuments database
RegionNitra.sk: Pečenice church

Villages and municipalities in Levice District